Gillian Cowlishaw  (born 1934) is a New Zealand-born anthropologist whose ethnographic research with Aboriginal Australians, investigates local cultures, histories and the relationship between settler colonialists and Indigenous people.

Biography 
Cowlishaw was born in the rural area of Otakiri, near Edgecumbe in the Bay of Plenty Region, New Zealand in 1934 and grew up on her parents' dairy farm with three siblings. She attended Otakiri School, followed by high school in Whakatane. When she was 17, she moved to Auckland to study at Auckland Teachers' Training College. After graduating and a year teaching in a rural school, she traveled to Italy, worked for some months in Hamburg and a 18 months in London, before returning to NZ via the Soviet Union and China. She married an English scientist and lived in Sydney, Adelaide and Singapore from where she returned to Sydney with her two children.

In 1970 she enrolled at the University of Sydney to study psychology and anthropology. Her Doctorate in anthropology focussed on Aboriginal women's lives and she spent time living in southern Arnhem Land in the Northern Territory to complete field work. She completed her PhD in anthropology in 1979. She went on to teach at Charles Sturt University, Australian National University, and the University of Sydney (1992 to 1997). She was a research professor at University of Technology Sydney (from 1998 to 2005) before returning to the University of Sydney.

Her 2004 book Blackfellas, Whitefellas and the Hidden Injuries of Race won the New South Wales Premier's Award:, the Gleebook Prize for Critical Writing in 2005.

In 2006 the Australian Research Council awarded Cowlishaw an Australian Professorial Fellowship. She used the fellowship to research urban Aborigines in Sydney's western suburbs.

Cowlishaw has contributed to a number of government and community agencies. She was commissioned to write a report for the Royal Commission into Aboriginal Deaths in Custody in 1990, for the Katherine Regional Aboriginal Legal Service in 2000, and for the Northern Land Council in 2004. From 1991 to 2001 she was an editor for the journal Oceania, and from 2006 to 2008 she was president of the Australian Anthropological Society. From 2009 she has convened the Sydney Writers' Anthropology Group (SWAG). In 2013, she was elected a Fellow of the Academy of the Social Sciences in Australia.

Publications 

Black, White or Brindle: race in rural Australia (1988) Cambridge: Cambridge University Press.
Rednecks, Eggheads and Blackfellas: racial power and intimacy in north Australia (1999) Sydney and Michigan: Allen and Unwin.
Blackfellas, Whitefellas and the Hidden Injuries of Race (2004) UK: Wiley-Blackwell Publishing. Awarded a Premiers Literary Award.
The City's Outback (2009) Sydney, Australia: University of New South Wales Press.

References 

1934 births
People from the Bay of Plenty Region
New Zealand anthropologists
New Zealand women anthropologists
University of Sydney alumni
Academic staff of Charles Sturt University
Academic staff of the University of Sydney
Academic staff of the University of Technology Sydney
Living people
Fellows of the Academy of the Social Sciences in Australia